Zelkova abelicea is a species of tree in the family Ulmaceae. It is referred to by the common names Cretan zelkova, and on Crete proper as abelitsia (αμπελιτσιά). It is endemic to Crete. It is found in small numbers and is classified as Vulnerable on the IUCN red list of endangered species.

Growth habit
The tree is strongly branched resulting in a dense, crown shaped habit that extends close to the ground. The leaves are small and green with serrated edges. Z.abelicea produces perfect hermaphroditic flowers which are small and scented, and pollination is therefore thought to be achieved by insects.

This species is capable of suckering, a form of reproduction where new shoots arise from an existing root system rather than from a seed. Natural regeneration by seed is rarely seen. Root cutting seem to show a 50% success rate, though best results may be seen in the cuttings taken from late August. Branch cutting of young shoots also root with moderate success when taken in late mid to late summer.

Shepherd's crook
Because of its tough nature, it was formerly the most preferred wood for making the traditional Cretan shepherd's versatile crook . Today it is forbidden by law to use Z. abelitsia for making a shepherd's crook, since it is made of an entire young tree.

Conservation status
The International Union for Conservation of Nature Red List of Threatened Species endangered (EN) – very high risk of extinction in the wild. The species is threatened by urbanization, habitat loss, overgrazing, and wildfires. Recent fieldwork seems to show that Z. abelicea is becoming more abundant.

Accessions

Europe
Icomb Place gardens, as Z. abelicea.

References

Sources
 Fielding, J. & Turland, N.; Mathew, B. (ed.), 2005. Flowers of Crete. Royal Botanic Gardens, Kew.
 Turland, N. J., Chilton, L. & Press, J. R., 1993. Flora of the Cretan area: annotated checklist & atlas [2nd impression, 1995, with printing errors corrected]. The Natural History Museum and HMSO, London.
 Søndergaard, P. & Egli, B.R.: Zelkova abelicea (Ulmaceae) in Crete: Floristics, Ecology, Propagation and Threats. - Willdenowia 36 (Special Issue): 317-322 - , copyright 2006 BGBM Berlin-Dahlem available as PDF file
 "Cretan Zelkova (Zelkova abelicea)." Arkive. Wildscreen: Promoting Conservation through Wildlife Imagery. 4 May 2009 <>.

Flora of Greece
abelicea
Vulnerable plants
Taxonomy articles created by Polbot
Taxa named by Jean-Baptiste Lamarck
Taxa named by Pierre Edmond Boissier
Flora of Crete